Villasavary is a commune in the Aude department in southern France.

Geography
It is situated in the Lauragais region, between Toulouse and Carcassonne.

Population

See also
Communes of the Aude department
List of medieval bridges in France

References

Communes of Aude